Pusia ebenus, common names brown mitre, ivory mitre, is a species of sea snail, a marine gastropod mollusk, in the family Costellariidae, the ribbed miters.

Description
The shell size varies between 20 mm and  36 mm

Distribution
This species is distributed in West European waters and in the Mediterranean Sea.

References

 Risso, A., 1826 - Histoire naturelle des principales productions de l'Europe Méridionale et particulièrement de celles des environs de Nice et des Alpes-Maritimes. Mollusques, vol. 4, p. 1-439, 12 pls
 Maravigna C. (1853). Descrizione di alcune nuove o poco conosciute specie di conchiglie siciliane. Atti dell'Accademia Gioenia di Scienze Naturali (2) 8: 121-140
 Arnaud, P. M., 1978. - Révision des taxa malacologiques méditerrannéens introduits par Antoine Risso. Annales du Muséum d'Histoire Naturelle de Nice "1977"5: 101-150
 Nordsieck, F. (1982). Die Europäischen Meeres-Gehäuseschnecken (Prosobranchia). Vom Eismeer bis Kapverden, Mittelmeer und Schwarzes Meer. 2., Völlig Neubearbeitete und Erweiterte Auflage. Gustav Fischer Verlag, Stuttgart, xii + 539: pp

External links
 Lamarck [J.B.M.de. (1811). Suite de la détermination des espèces de Mollusques testacés. Mitre (Mitra.). Annales du Muséum National d'Histoire Naturelle. 17: 195-222.]
 Risso A. (1826). Histoire naturelle des principales productions de l'Europe méridionale et particulièrement de celles des environs de Nice et des Alpes Maritimes, vol. 4. Paris: Levrault. vii + 439 pp., pls 1-12
 Locard, A. (1886). Prodrome de malacologie française. Catalogue général des mollusques vivants de France. Mollusques marins. Lyon: H. Georg & Paris: Baillière. x + 778 pp
 Locard, A. (1891). Les coquilles marines des côtes de France. Annales de la Société Linnéenne de Lyon. 37: 1-385 
 Payraudeau, B. C. (1826). Catalogue descriptif et méthodique des annelides et des mollusques de l'Ile de Corse; avec huit planches représentant quatre-vingt-huit espèces, dont soixante-huit nouvelles. 218 pp. Paris
 Pallary, P. (1903). Addition à la faune conchyliologique de la Méditerranée. Ann. Mus. Hist. nat. Marseille, Zool. 8: 4-16, plate 1. Marseille.
 Pallary, P. (1912). Sur la faune de l'ancienne lagune de Tunis. Bulletin de la Société d'Histoire Naturelle de l'Afrique du Nord. 4 (9): 215-228
 Brocchi, G. B. (1814). Conchiologia fossile subapennina con osservazioni geologiche sugli Apennini e sul suolo adiacente. Milano. Vol. 1: i-lxxx, 1-56, 1-240; vol. 2: 241-712, 16 pls
 Pallary, P. (1900). Coquilles marines du littoral du département d'Oran. Journal de Conchyliologie. 48(3): 211-422
 Weinkauff H. C. (1867-1868). Die Conchylien des Mittelmeeres, ihre geographische und geologisches Verbreitung. T. Fischer, Cassel Vol. 1: pp. XIX + 307
 Locard, A. (1890). Notices conchyliologiques. X. Les Mitres des côtes de France. i>L'Echange 6(62): 109-110

ebenus